The Surrey Bowl is an annual rugby union knock-out club competition organized by the Surrey Rugby Football Union.  It was introduced in 2006 and the inaugural winners were Merton.  It is the fourth most important rugby union cup competition in Surrey, behind the Surrey Cup, Surrey Trophy and Surrey Shield.

The Surrey Bowl is currently open to  club sides based in Surrey and parts of south London, that play in tier 11 (Surrey 3) and tier 12 (Surrey 4) of the English rugby union league system.  The format is a knockout cup with a first round, second round, semi-finals and final to be held at Molesey Road (Esher's home ground) in May on the same date and same venue as the other Surrey finals.

Surrey Bowl winners

Number of wins
Old Glynonians (3)
Merton (2)
Old Rutlishians (2)
Economicals (1)
Guildfordians (1)
Old Blues (1)
Old Haileyburian (1)
Streatham-Croydon (1)

See also
Surrey RFU
Surrey Cup
Surrey Trophy
Surrey Shield

References

External links
Surrey RFU

Recurring sporting events established in 2006
2006 establishments in England
Rugby union cup competitions in England
Rugby union in Surrey